This is a list of presidents and governors of the Venezuelan Zulia State.
In some years the head of Zulia state was known as President or Civil and Military Chief, in others Governor. In 1881 Zulia was joined in a union with Falcón. Its autonomy was restored in 1890 with Maracaibo as its capital.

Presidents
 1863-1868	Jorge Sutherland
 1868-1870	José María Hernández (Venezuela)
 1870-1874	Venancio Pulgar
 1880	José Victorino García Olavarría

Governors
Until 1989, governors were appointed by the President of Venezuela. Starting from that year they are elected in universal, direct and secret elections.

List of elected governors

See also

 History of Venezuela
 List of Governors of States of Venezuela
 Politics of Venezuela
 Zulia state

References

  Galería de Gobernadores del Estado ZuliaZulia State Government website.

Politicians from Zulia
Governors
Zulia
Zulia